Juraj Tóth (born 28 March 1975) is a Slovak astronomer, discoverer of minor planets, and professor of astronomy at Comenius University in Bratislava, Slovakia.

An expert in meteoroid fragmentation, he is known for his observations of the 1998 Leonid meteor shower from Modra Observatory, which were later published in the journal Earth, Moon, and Planets. His photograph of the Leonid meteor shower was credited by NASA.

Tóth is a member of the International Astronomical Union and currently a professor at Comenius University in the department of astronomy. He is credited by the Minor Planet Center with the discovery and co-discovery of 16 numbered minor planets between 1998 and 2001.

He has published in numerous journals on astronomy, mainly on meteoroids. His work, Orbital Evolution of Příbram and Neuschwanstein, has been shown in the Smithsonian Astrophysical Observatory. In 2010, he led a field expedition, which found the first piece of the "Košice" meteorite fall. Košice is the 14th meteorite in the world with a pedigree.

He is married and has three children.

The main-belt asteroid 24976 Jurajtoth, discovered by LONEOS in 1998, was named in his honor.

Publications 
 Porubčan, V., Tóth, J., Yano, H.: On fragmentation of meteoroids in interplanetary space, Contrib. Astron. Obs. Skalnaté Pleso, 32, 132 - 144. (2002)
 Vereš, P.; Kornos, L.; Tóth, J.: Search for very close approaching NEAs, Contrib. Astron. Obs. Skalnat´e Pleso 36, 171 – 180, (2006)
 Vereš, P.; Klačka, J.; Kómar1, L.; Tóth, J.: Motion of a Meteoroid Released from an Asteroid , Earth, Moon, and Planets v.102:1-4, p. 47-51. (June, 2008)
 Tóth, J.; Kornos, L.; Porubčan, V.: Photographic Leonids 1998 Observed at Modra Observatory, Earth, Moon, and Planets 	v.82-83:0, 285-294.
 Kornoš, L.; Tóth, J.; Vereš, P.: Orbital Evolution of Příbram and Neuschwanstein, Earth, Moon, and Planets, v.102:1-4, 59-65

References

External links 
 Juraj Tóth at Comenius University
 CV, Juraj Tóth

1975 births
Comenius University alumni
Academic staff of Comenius University
Discoverers of minor planets

Living people
Slovak astronomers
Scientists from Bratislava